Arginine Vasopressin (AVP) Gene is a gene whose product is proteolytically cleaved to produce vasopressin (also known as antidiuretic hormone (ADH)), neurophysin II, and a glycoprotein called copeptin. AVP and other AVP-like peptides are found in mammals, as well as mollusks, arthropods, nematodes, and other invertebrate species. In humans, AVP is present on chromosome 20 and plays a role in homeostatic regulation. The products of AVP have many functions that include vasoconstriction, regulating the balance of water in the body, and regulating responses to stress. Expression of AVP is regulated by the Transcription Translation Feedback Loop (TTFL), which is an important part of the circadian system that controls the expression of clock genes. AVP has important implications in the medical field as its products have significant roles throughout body.

Discovery

Vasopressin 
The discovery of the AVP gene first required the discovery of one of its key products: vasopressin. In 1895, G. Oliver and E.A. Schäfer found that a substance released by the pituitary gland could elevate blood pressure. The researchers noted that intravenous injection of extracts from the pituitary gland, thyroid gland, and spleen all influence blood pressure, however the effect from the pituitary had the most significant impact. Almost thirty years later, Kamm and colleagues separated the components within the pituitary gland. Using a unique, five-step separation technique, Kamm revealed one substance associated with uterine contractions – oxytocin – and another substance associated with blood pressure – vasopressin.

Once the discovery and separation of vasopressin occurred, subsequent research on the product's structure, function, and mode of generation could take place. In 1951, Turner and colleagues uncovered the amino acid sequence behind the hormone. The amino acid structure was composed of eight amino acids, including phenylalanine, tyrosine, proline, glutamic acid, aspartic acid, glycine, arginine, and cystine. The structure was also found to include ammonia. Following this discovery, Vincent du Vigneaud was able to synthesize a synthetic form of vasopressin in a laboratory setting. Du Vigneaud specifically noted that his final product had the same activity and composition ratios as that of naturally occurring vasopressin.

AVP gene 
The work on vasopressin ultimately allowed researchers to work backwards and identify the gene responsible for this product's generation. This final stage of research began when Gainer and colleagues found a precursor protein to vasopressin in 1977. The structure of the protein was subsequently discovered by Land in 1982. By sequencing complementary DNA strands that encoded for the hormone's mRNA, Land outlined the amino acid sequence of the precursor protein. Finally, one year later, Schmale, Heinsohn, and Richter isolated the AVP precursor gene in rats from their genomic library. The researchers used restriction mapping and nucleotide sequence analysis to uncover the gene's three distinct exons and the products (vasopressin, neurophysin, and glycoprotein) that each was responsible for.

Structure 
The 1.85 kilobase-long AVP gene, located on chromosome 20 (20p13) contains three functional domains, including AVP, neurophysin II (NP) and a C-terminal glycopeptide called copeptin. Using restriction mapping and sequencing, the gene was found to have these domains which spanned over three exons with two intronic sequences. Exon A encodes a putative signal peptide, the arginine vasopressin hormone, and the N terminus of the NP carrier protein. Exon B, which is separated from exon A with a 1 kilobase-long intron, encodes the conserved middle portion of NP. A 227 kilobase intron separates exon B from exon C, which encodes the final domain, including the C terminus of NP and the glycoprotein. The structure of this gene has been found to be generally conserved across species, including chimpanzees, Rhesus monkeys, dogs, cows, mice, rats, chicken, zebrafish, and frogs.

Promoter region 
The AVP gene promoter region consists of an E-box element located 150 residues upstreams of the transcription start site, which binds mammalian clock proteins CLOCK and BMAL1 involved in generating circadian rhythms in the suprachiasmatic nucleus (SCN). BMAL1 and CLOCK gene knockouts in the SCN (Bmal-/- and clk-/-) eliminate rhythmicity in AVP mRNA expression, confirming that binding of the protein heterodimers to the E-box element is necessary for the intrinsic circadian pattern of the AVP gene. In addition to the E-box element, the promoter region of the AVP gene also contains a cAMP response element (CRE) site that is involved in gene expression regulation. Daily rhythms in the phosphorylation of the CRE binding protein (CREB) supports that these elements also contribute to circadian rhythmicity of the gene expression. CRE/CREB-mediated regulation of the AVP gene is activated through the cAMP activation of Ras signaling pathways, culminating in the MAP kinase phosphorylation of the CREB transcription factor.

Transcription of the AVP gene to produce AVP mRNA has daily rhythms, with mRNA levels peaking during the subjective day and reaching their lowest point in the subject night. This rhythm is regulated by the binding of circadian proteins to the E-box, along with transcriptional regulation of other elements, including the CRE in the promoter region.

Function 
AVP is primarily known for its role as a mammalian circadian output. The most common product of AVP is vasopressin, which is a neurohypophysial hormone that is important in homeostatic mechanisms and processes, like cortical EEG rhythms. Its other products are neurophysin II and copeptin. AVP is produced in a specific type of neuron called magnocellular neurons (MCNs), which are located in the hypothalamus. In mammals, the AVP gene is also transcribed in the suprachiasmatic nucleus where its expression is under the control of the circadian TTFL. It is well established that the finished vasopressin product is transported from the cell body to the terminals in the posterior pituitary gland where it is released into the bloodstream as a result of environmental stressors like dehydration.

Gene Regulation 
AVP gene regulation is controlled by the TTFL. In this system, per2 protein is transcribed and phosphorylated by the CK1E enzyme. Accumulation of this protein inhibits the transcription factors Clock and BMAL1, so that no additional per product is created. At the same time, per2 inhibits the transcription factors driving the AVP gene so that its expression and products are reduced. It can be noted that AVP expression is regulated by the TTFL in the SCN but not in the paraventricular nucleus of the hypothalamus (PVH) and supraoptic nucleus (SON).

Receptor Pathways 
The transcription of the AVP gene commonly results in the binding of vasopressin to one of three vasopressin receptors: AVPR1A, AVPR1B, and AVPR2. When vasopressin binds to AVPR1A, a G-protein coupled receptor (GPCR), phospholipase C (PLC) becomes activated. This pathway typically involves regulating vasoconstriction. When vasopressin binds to AVPR1B, a GPCR, the phosphatidylinositol-calcium second messenger system is stimulated. AVPR1A and AVPR1B are GPCRs that stimulate PLC to promote the production of DAG which activates PKC and IP3 and stimulates calcium ion release from the ER. This signaling pathway is important in regulating homeostasis and the amount of water, glucose, and salts within the blood via ACTH release and storage. When vasopressin binds to AVPR2, another GPCR, adenylyl cyclase is stimulated. This second messenger pathway involves the regulation of ADH, or vasopressin, in the kidneys, which has an important diuretic purpose of retaining water and manipulating the concentrations of soluble toxic wastes and urea in urine.

AVP gene in rats 
Within rats, the AVP gene is important for the regulation of various processes associated with the excretory system and smooth muscle cells. The AVP gene and arginine vasopressin are commonly colocalized with oxytocin because synaptic transmission of oxytocin regulates the expression of AVP mRNA.

In one study conducted by Greenwood and colleagues, researchers found that AVP gene expression in rats is regulated by the cAMP responsive element-binding protein-3 like-1 (CREB3L1).  CREB3L1 is activated when it is cleaved and when the AVP gene is translocated from the Golgi to the nucleus. Additionally, CREB3L1 mRNA levels correspond with increased amounts of transcription of the AVP gene in the hypothalamus following a deficiency of sodium and as a consequence of diurnal rhythm in the SCN. Both full-length and constitutively active forms of CREB3L1 (CREB3L1CA) induce the expression of rat AVP promoter-luciferase reporter constructs whereas a dominant-negative mutant reduces expression. From this study, the researchers concluded that CREB3L1 is a regulator of AVP gene transcription in the hypothalamus and specifically within the PVH and SON.

Arginine vasopressin stimulates the process of phosphorylation of aquaporin 2 (AQP2) of renal tissue which contributes to the overall increased permeability of water in the collecting duct cells of the tissue. The phosphorylation of AQP2 leads to activation of the protein kinase A signaling pathway which amplifies the permeability of water by stimulating the rat equivalent of the urea transporter 1 protein.

Medical applications 

The functions of vasopressin make it useful for a variety of important medical applications. Since it plays a role in the regulation of many physiological functions, like regulation of water and sodium excretion, blood volume, vasoconstriction, and response to stress, vasopressin can be helpful in the treatment of conditions related to these functions. These applications include treatment of nocturnal enuresis, diabetes insipidus, and hemophilia A. Additionally, it is used to treat some forms of shock including septic shock and vasodilatory shock. It is also used during surgery to decrease blood loss.

References 

Genes on human chromosome 20